Friedrich Wiese (5 December 1892 – 13 February 1975) was a German general in the Wehrmacht who commanded the 19th Army. He was a recipient of the Knight's Cross of the Iron Cross with Oak Leaves of Nazi Germany.

Awards and decorations
 Iron Cross (1914)  2nd Class (15 February 1916) & 1st Class (29 September 1918)
 Clasp to the Iron Cross (1939) 2nd Class (3 June 1940) & 1st Class (14 June 1940)
 German Cross in Gold on 16 February 1942 as Oberst in Infanterie-Regiment 39
 Knight's Cross of the Iron Cross with Oak Leaves
 Knight's Cross on 14 February 1942 as Oberst and commander of Infanterie-Regiment 39
 Oak Leaves on 24 January 1944 as General der Infanterie and commander of XXXV. Armeekorps

Citations

Bibliography

1892 births
1975 deaths
Generals of Infantry (Wehrmacht)
German Army personnel of World War I
German police officers
People from Dithmarschen
People from the Province of Schleswig-Holstein
Recipients of the clasp to the Iron Cross, 1st class
Recipients of the Gold German Cross
Recipients of the Knight's Cross of the Iron Cross with Oak Leaves
Military personnel from Schleswig-Holstein
German Army generals of World War II